is an interchange passenger railway station located in the city of Hikone, Shiga, Japan. It is operated jointly by the West Japan Railway Company (JR West) and the private railway operator Ohmi Railway/

Lines
It is also a station on the Ohmi Railway Main Line and is 5.8 kilometers from the starting point of that line at Maibara.

Layout
The JR Station has two opposed side platforms serving two tracks. Both platforms are connected to the ticket gate on the bridge over the tracks. The east end of the bridge, on the ground, is the Ohmi Railway station wishbone island platform. The station has a Midori no Madoguchi staffed ticket office.

Platform

Adjacent stations

History
The station opened on 1 July 1889 as a station for passengers and cargo on the Japanese Government Railway (JGR) Tōkaidō Line, which became the Japan National Railways (JNR) after World War II. The Ohmi Railway opened on 11 June 1898. Freight operations were discontinued in November 1986. The station came under the aegis of the West Japan Railway Company (JR West) on 1 April 1987 due to the privatization of JNR.

Station numbering was introduced in March 2018 with Hikone being assigned station number JR-A13.

Passenger statistics
In fiscal 2019, the JR station was used by an average of 10,489 passengers daily (boarding passengers only). During the same period, the Ohmi Railway portion of the station was used by 1,371 passengers daily (boarding passengers only)

Surrounding area
Hikone Castle 
Ryōtan-ji
Sawayama Castle 
Shiga Gokoku Shrine
Shiga University 
Shiga Prefectural Hikone Higashi High School 

Lake Biwa

See also
List of railway stations in Japan

References

External links

JR West official home page
Ohmi Railway official home page

Railway stations in Japan opened in 1889
Tōkaidō Main Line
Railway stations in Shiga Prefecture
Hikone, Shiga